Cryptachaea veruculata is a spider native to Australia and New Zealand. It has been introduced into England and Belgium. The species has potential to control spider mites and leafroller caterpillars in New Zealand.

Description
Females reach a body size of about 4 mm, males only about 1.5 mm. They sometimes build small webs in flowers and green vegetation, but will also build webs in corners of the outer walls of buildings.

Taxonomy
This species was moved from genus Achaearanea in 2008.

Name
Common names include Diamond Comb-footed Spider. In New Zealand, it is also known as just "cobweb spider".

Notes

References
 Yeates, G.W. & Williams, P.A. (2006): Export of Plant and Animal Species from an Insular Biota. in: Biological Invasions in New Zealand.  — 
 Platnick, Norman I. (2009): The world spider catalog, version 9.5. American Museum of Natural History.

Further reading
 Yoshida, Hajime (2008): A revision of the genus Achaearanea (Araneae: Theridiidae). Acta Arachnologica 57(1): 37-40. PDF

External links
 Find-a-spider Guide: Photographs of C. veruculata
 Brisbane Insects: Pictures of C. veruculata

Theridiidae
Spiders of Australia
Spiders of New Zealand
Spiders of Europe
Spiders described in 1885